I Love Brazil! is a 1977 studio album by Sarah Vaughan, accompanied by prominent Brazilian musicians Milton Nascimento, Dori Caymmi, and Antônio Carlos Jobim.

This was Vaughan's first album of bossa nova/MPB, it was followed by Copacabana (1979), and Brazilian Romance (1987). It was also her first album for Pablo Records.

Reception

The Allmusic review by Ron Wynn awards the album two and a half stars, saying that "Sarah Vaughan's recordings during the last phase of her magnificent career weren't always up to her usual standards, but this late-'70s set focusing on Brazilian music was a superb exception."

The album garnered a Grammy nomination.

Track listing
 "If You Went Away (Preciso Aprender a Ser Só)" (Ray Gilbert, Marcos Valle, Paulo Sérgio Valle) - 4:25
 "Triste" (Antônio Carlos Jobim) - 2:58
 "Roses and Roses (Das Rosas)" (Dorival Caymmi, Gilbert) - 3:23
 "Empty Faces (Vera Cruz)" (Lani Hall, Milton Nascimento) - 6:26
 "I Live to Love You (Morrer de Amor)" (Oscar Castro-Neves, Luverci Fiorini, Gilbert) - 3:54
 "The Face I Love (Seu Encanto)" (Gilbert, Carlos Pingarilho, M. Valle) - 3:29
 "Courage (Coragem)" (Nascimento, Cootie Williams) - 3:42
 "The Day It Rained (Chuva)" (Pedro Camargo, Durval Ferreira, Gilbert) - 4:40
 "A Little Tear (Razão de Viver)" (Deodato, Gilbert, P.S. Valle) - 4:07
 "Like a Lover (Cantador)" (Alan and Marilyn Bergman, Dori Caymmi, Nelson Motta) - 4:45
 "Bridges (Travessia)" (Nascimento, Fernando Brant, Gene Lees) - 4:12
 "Someone to Light Up My Life (Se Todos Fossem Iguais a Vocë)" (Jobim, Vinicius de Moraes, Lees) - 3:26
Tracks 11 and 12 are CD reissue bonus tracks.

Personnel
Sarah Vaughan - vocals
Dorival Caymmi - vocals (3)
Milton Nascimento - acoustic guitar, vocals (4,7,11)
Dori Caymmi - acoustic guitar, vocals (10)
Nelson Angelo - electric guitar (4,7,11)
Hélio Delmiro - electric guitar (1-3,6,8-9,12)
Danilo Caymmi - flute (4,7,11)
Paulo Jobim - flute (4,7,11)
Mauricio Einhorn - harmonica (8)
Antônio Carlos Jobim - piano (2,12)
José Roberto Bertrami - electric piano (1-3,6,8-9), organ (4,7,11)
Edson Frederico - orchestration (1-3,5-6,8-9,12), piano (5)
Sergio Barroso -  acoustic bass (1-2,6,9,12)
Claudio Bertrami - acoustic bass (3,8)
Novelli - electric bass (4,7,11)
Wilson das Neves - drums (1-3,6,8-9,12)
Robertinho Silva - (4,7,11)
Ariovaldo - percussion (1-4,6-7,9,11-12)
Chico Batera - percussion  (1-4,6-7,9,11-12)
Luna - percussion (12)
Marçal - percussion (12)
Production
Durval Ferreira - creative director
Sheldon Marks - design, layout design
Norman Granz - design, layout design, liner notes
Mário Jorge Bruno - engineer
Tamaki Beck - mastering
Aloísio de Oliveira - producer

References

Pablo Records albums
Sarah Vaughan albums
Bossa nova albums
1977 albums